Aznabyurt (also, Aznabirt and Aznaburt) is a village in the Kangarli District of the Nakhchivan Autonomous Republic of Azerbaijan. It was originally an Armenian village called Znaberd, which remained Armenian until 1989.

References 

Villages in Azerbaijan
Populated places in Nakhchivan Autonomous Republic